Sears Dreadnought was a motorcycle sold by Sears in the 1910s. The motorcycle featured a  V-twin made by Spacke. It was sourced from Spacke's cyclecar and had . This engine was also used by Dayton, Eagle, Minneapolis and Crawford.National Motorcycle Museum Featured Motorcycle 1913 Sears De Luxe Dreadnought Twin In addition to the internal combustion engine, it also had foot-pedals like a regular bicycle.Old Motorcycles Take the Stage By JIM McCRAW Published: September 14, 2001 (This was for getting the engine started as the kick start had not been invented yet.)

The motorcycle was designed for Sears in conjunction with  Excelsior Company of N. Sangamon Street, Chicago. They put together popular components  and features of the period including the Spacke V-twin engine, a Schebler carburetor, Musselman hub, chain drive, etc.1912 SEARS De Luxe Dreadnaught Twin It was offered with various options such as a two-speed hub and a lightning package.1912 SEARS De Luxe Dreadnaught Twin

Sears sold the motorcycle like its other products via mail order for $250 in 1913 ($ in  dollars ). People would shop out of large catalog of thousands of items rather than the local store, then the product would be delivered to them. Sears sold motorcycles from 1912 to 1916. The motorcycle is also called the Sears De Luxe Dreadnought Twin.National Motorcycle Museum Featured Motorcycle 1913 Sears De Luxe Dreadnought Twin DeLuxe was the marque of the Spacke engine company and was on the engine itself.Spacke And the CycleCar Era

By the year 2001 it was thought about ten Sears Dreadnoughts remain, and one went for a Sotheby's auction for over US$100,000.American Motorcyclist Dec 2001 By the end of the 20th century the motorcycles of this era were lauded as works of art, being featured for example in the prestigious Guggenheim Museums.Old Motorcycles Take the Stage By JIM McCRAW Published: September 14, 2001

Features
 V-twin by Spacke Machine Company of Indianapolis, Indiana
Schebler Model H carburetor
Bosch magneto
Eclipse pulley and clutch

See also
Thor Model U (A contemporary of the Sears model in the 1910s)
Harley-Davidson Model 7D (another contemporary, came out in 1911)
FN Four (a Belgian motorcycle of the period)
List of motorcycles of the 1910s

References

Further reading
A 1913 issue of Motorcycle Illustrated gives a window into the World the Sears De Luxe Dreadnought was a part of Links to Google Books)
Website about spake Spacke

Motorcycles introduced in the 1910s